Combebow is a small settlement in Devon, England. It is situated by the River Lew.

External links

Combebow at Streetmap.co.uk

Villages in Devon